The following is a summary of the Classic 100 Opera survey conducted by the ABC Classic FM radio station during 2005/6.

Survey summary

See also
Classic 100 Countdowns

References

Official ABC Classic FM Classic 100 Opera site

Classic 100 Countdowns (ABC)
2005 in Australian music
2006 in Australian music
2005 in radio
2006 in radio